The 2021 ICF Canoe Sprint World Championships were held from 16 to 19 September 2021 in Copenhagen, Denmark.

In a break with convention, these championships were held in an Olympic year as the COVID-19 pandemic forced a year-long postponement of the Tokyo 2020 Olympic & Paralympic Games.

Canoe sprint

Medal table

Men
 Non-Olympic classes

Canoe

Kayak

Women
 Non-Olympic classes

Canoe

Kayak

Mixed
 Non-Olympic classes

Paracanoe

Medal table

Medal events
 Non-Paralympic classes

References

External links
Spotfokus results website
ICF event site

 
ICF Canoe Sprint World Championships
World Championships
2021 in Danish sport
International sports competitions hosted by Denmark
Sport in Copenhagen
Canoeing in Denmark
ICF